Nailson Fernando Medeiros (born 24 February 1994), simply known as Nailson, is a Brazilian footballer who plays as a central defender for Al-Jabalain.

Personal life
Still an active player, Nailson has a YouTube channel which shows the background of a footballer's life.

Career
Born in Jaguapitã, Paraná, Nailson joined Santos FC's youth setup in 2012, after playing for Grêmio and Juventus-SP. He was promoted to the main squad in 2014 by manager Oswaldo de Oliveira.

On 2 April 2014 Nailson made his first-team debut, starting in a 0-0 away draw against Mixto at Arena Pantanal, for that year's Copa do Brasil. He was released by the club at the end of the year.

On 2 May 2015 Nailson signed a one-year deal with Mogi Mirim.

On 2 July 2019, he signed a two-year contract with an option to extend for one additional year with the Russian Football National League club Baltika Kaliningrad. He left the club in 2020, after terminating his contract.

On 20 January 2021, Nailson was announced at Juventus, a club he already represented as a youth.

On 26 July 2021, Nailson joined Al-Adalah. On 16 June 2022, Nailson joined Al-Jabalain after leaving Al-Adalah.

Career statistics

Honours
Santos
 Copa São Paulo de Futebol Júnior: 2013, 2014
 Copa do Brasil Sub-20: 2013

References

External links
 
 

 

1994 births
Living people
Brazilian footballers
Association football defenders
Campeonato Brasileiro Série A players
Santos FC players
Mogi Mirim Esporte Clube players
Clube Atlético Juventus players
Liga Portugal 2 players
U.D. Leiria players
F.C. Famalicão players
Al-Adalah FC players
Al-Jabalain FC players
Ukrainian Premier League players
FC Zirka Kropyvnytskyi players
Russian Premier League players
Saudi First Division League players
FC Baltika Kaliningrad players
Brazilian expatriate footballers
Brazilian expatriate sportspeople in Portugal
Brazilian expatriate sportspeople in Ukraine
Brazilian expatriate sportspeople in Russia
Brazilian expatriate sportspeople in Saudi Arabia
Expatriate footballers in Portugal
Expatriate footballers in Ukraine
Expatriate footballers in Russia
Expatriate footballers in Saudi Arabia